Paweł Król may refer to:

 Paweł Król (footballer, born 1960), Polish international footballer
 Paweł Król (footballer, born 1987), Polish footballer

See also
 Krol